Cumberland North is a provincial electoral district in  Nova Scotia, Canada, that elects one member of the Nova Scotia House of Assembly. Prior to 1993, it was part of Cumberland East.

The communities of Amherst and Pugwash are within its boundaries.

Geography

Members of the Legislative Assembly
This electoral district has elected the following Members of the Legislative Assembly:

Election results

1993 general election

1997 by-election 

|-
 
|Progressive Conservative
|Ernie Fage
|align="right"|4954
|align="right"|
|align="right"|
|-
 
|Liberal
|Russell Scott
|align="right"|2123
|align="right"|
|align="right"|
|-
 
|New Democratic Party
|Dorothy Jorgensen
|align="right"|1014
|align="right"|
|align="right"|
|}

1998 general election

1999 general election

2003 general election

2006 general election

2009 general election

2013 general election 

|-
 
|Liberal
|Terry Farrell
|align="right"| 2,944
|align="right"| 39.81
|align="right"| 
|-
 
|Progressive Conservative
|Judith Marie Giroux 
|align="right"| 2,230
|align="right"| 30.15
|align="right"| 
|-
 
|New Democratic Party
|Brian Skabar
|align="right"| 1,943
|align="right"| 26.27
|align="right"| 
|-

|}

2017 general election

2021 general election 

Notes
  For both the 2009 and 2021 general elections in this riding, the results of both the Independent and Progressive Conservative candidates are compared to the PC total in the respective previous elections. In both races, the incumbent sought re-election as an Independent after being elected as a PC MLA in the previous election.

External links
riding profile
June 13, 2006 Nova Scotia Provincial General Election Poll By Poll Results

References

Election Summary From 1867 - 2007
1993 Poll by Poll Results
1988 Poll by Poll Results
1984 Poll by Poll Results
1981 Poll by Poll Results
1978 Poll by Poll Results
1974 Poll by Poll Results
1970 Poll by Poll Results
1967 Poll by Poll Results

Amherst, Nova Scotia
Nova Scotia provincial electoral districts